The Lawrenceville Street Historic District, in McDonough, Georgia, is a  historic district which was listed on the National Register of Historic Places in 2009.  It included 27 contributing buildings and a contributing structure.

It consists of houses along a street which arcs northeast and east from the Henry County Courthouse.  These include:
House at 34 Lawrenceville Street (c.1900), a New South cottage with "the complex massing of a Queen Anne cottage and a central hall"
C.W. Walker House (1888), 56 Lawrenceville Street, a two-story, three-bay Georgian
House at 61 Lawrenceville Street (c.1890), a central-hall plan house with a Greek Revival-style porch and a steeply pitched Gothic Revival-style cross-gable roof
House at 97 Lawrenceville Street (1904), "an excellent example of a Georgian-plan cottage"
House at 215 Lawrenceville Street (1916), Renaissance Revival-style  This is the Turner House, pictured above.

However, as of 2019, the first three of these have been demolished.

References

External links
 

Historic districts on the National Register of Historic Places in Georgia (U.S. state)
Queen Anne architecture in Georgia (U.S. state)
Colonial Revival architecture in Georgia (U.S. state)
Buildings and structures completed in 1823
Henry County, Georgia